The Edgar Vernon House, located off U.S. Route 16 in Presho, South Dakota, was listed on the National Register of Historic Places in 1978.

It was built in 1908 and is a one-and-a-half-story house with some elements of Victorian architectural style;  it was the grandest house in the area.  It was built for the Edgar Vernon family who came from Delaware to Lyman County, South Dakota in 1907.  It was built by carpenters Emery Fry, David Holmes, and Bill Nelson.

The house served as a flu hospital during World War I.

References

Houses on the National Register of Historic Places in South Dakota
Victorian architecture in South Dakota
Houses completed in 1908
Lyman County, South Dakota